The Women's long jump event at the 2013 European Athletics Indoor Championships was held on March 1, 2013 at 10:05 (qualification) and March 2, 16:00 (final) local time.

Records

Results

Qualification
Qualification: Qualification Performance 6.65 (Q) or at least 8 best performers advanced to the final.

Final
The final was held at 16:00.

References

Long jump at the European Athletics Indoor Championships
2013 European Athletics Indoor Championships
2013 in women's athletics